Mannosylglycerate hydrolase (2-O-(6-phospho-mannosyl)-D-glycerate hydrolase, alpha-mannosidase, mngB (gene)) is an enzyme with systematic name 2-O-(6-phospho-alpha-D-mannosyl)-D-glycerate acylhydrolase. This enzyme catalyses the following chemical reaction

 2-O-(6-phospho-alpha-D-mannosyl)-D-glycerate + H2O  D-mannose 6-phosphate + D-glycerate

The enzyme participates in the mannosylglycerate degradation pathway of some bacteria.

References

External links 
 

EC 3.2.1